On 27 July 1989, Korean Air Flight 803, a DC-10 crashed while attempting to land in Tripoli, Libya. 75 of the 199 passengers and crew on board plus 4 people on the ground were killed in the crash. The crash was the deadliest aviation disaster to occur in Libya at the time.

Aircraft and crew 
The aircraft involved was a McDonnell Douglas DC-10-30 (serial number 47887 and line number 125). It was built in 1973 and made its first flight on 17 September. During the test period, the aircraft was registered N54634. The aircraft was powered by three General Electric CF6-50C2 turbofan engines. In 1974, the aircraft was sold to Air Siam, and it was registered in Thailand as HS-VGE on 25 November. In 1977, the airliner was sold to Korean Air (which at the time was Korean Air Lines), and received the Korean registration HL7328 on 25 February 1977. The aircraft had 49,025 flight hours and 11,440 take-off and landing cycles. The captain was Kim Ho-jung (54), the first officer was Choi Jae-hong (57), and the flight engineer was  Hyun Gyu-hwan (53).

Accident 
Flight 803 was a scheduled International passenger service from Seoul, South Korea to Tripoli, Libya with intermediate stops in Bangkok, Thailand and Jeddah, Saudi Arabia. There were a total of 18 crew members and 181 passengers, mostly South Korean workers, who were returning to Libya for construction work after their home leave. Nevertheless, in such circumstances, the flight crew decided to continue the approach. On approach to runway 27, the DC-10 dropped below the glide path, then at 7:05 (according to other data - 7:30), it crashed into two buildings, broke into three sections, and burst into flames. The crash site was in an orchard  short of runway 27. 75 people (72 passengers and 3 crew members) died in the crash, in addition to four people on the ground.

Daewoo and Donga had multiple South Korean employees on board.

There were 189 South Koreans, seven Libyans, and three Japanese nationals.

Investigation 
At the direction of the Libyan authorities, French specialists were invited to investigate the causes of the accident. The flight recorders were sent to France. American representatives, including the aircraft manufacturer, were not allowed into Libya at the time.

Aftermath 
After the crash, Flight 803's captain Kim Ho-jung was quoted as saying - "The airport was shrouded in dense fog and visibility was poor when I approached. I lost contact with the control tower for 15 minutes before the crash." Libya's official news agency JANA reported that a Soviet airliner one hour before Flight 803 had rerouted to Malta rather than land in the fog. Also the instrument landing system at Tripoli International Airport wasn't working at the time of the crash.

A Libyan court found the captain and first officer guilty of neglect in December 1990. They were given prison sentences of two years and eighteen months respectively. In the case of the first officer the sentence was suspended.

Cause 
The cause of the crash was determined to be pilot error in attempting a descent below decision height without the runway environment in sight.

References

1989 in Libya
Aviation accidents and incidents in 1989
Airliner accidents and incidents involving fog
Airliner accidents and incidents caused by pilot error
Aviation accidents and incidents in Libya
Accidents and incidents involving the McDonnell Douglas DC-10
803
Airliner accidents and incidents involving controlled flight into terrain
Airliner accidents and incidents caused by weather
1989 meteorology
July 1989 events in Africa
1989 in South Korea